Margje Josepha Teeuwen (born 21 May 1974 in Eindhoven, North Brabant) is a field hockey midfielder from the Netherlands, who played 145 international matches for the Dutch National Women's Team, in which she scored fifteen goals.

Teeuwen twice won the bronze medal, in 1996 and 2000, and retired from international competition after the Sydney Games. She is married to a famous Dutch dj Rob Stenders. He has his own radiostation on the internet called KX Radio. Teeuwen does also have a program on this station.

External links
 
 Dutch Hockey Federation
 Personal website

1974 births
Field hockey players at the 1996 Summer Olympics
Field hockey players at the 2000 Summer Olympics
Dutch female field hockey players
Living people
Olympic field hockey players of the Netherlands
Olympic bronze medalists for the Netherlands
Sportspeople from Eindhoven
Olympic medalists in field hockey
Medalists at the 1996 Summer Olympics
Medalists at the 2000 Summer Olympics
Oranje Zwart players
20th-century Dutch women
21st-century Dutch women